David Evans (born 4 April 1967) is a former professional footballer who played in The Football League for Chester City as a defender.

Evans was the product of a football family, as his father Bernard Evans and uncle Dennis Evans had both played professionally for clubs including Tranmere Rovers and Wrexham. and his older brother Gary had been an apprentice at Liverpool FC. As a youngster he joined Manchester United on schoolboy terms and went on to play for Wales at under 15 and under 19 level.

After leaving school in 1983, Evans joined Chester City as an apprentice and his debut arrived aged just 16 years and 236 daysin a 0–0 draw against Doncaster Rovers on 26 November 1983. Over the next two years he made 16 league appearances and played three cup games for Chester, with his only goal coming in a 5–2 win over Darlington on 23 February 1985.

Evans remained at the club for the start of the 1985–86 but did not make any appearances under new manager Harry McNally and moved into non–league football with Bangor City.

References

1967 births
Living people
Sportspeople from Chester
English Football League players
Welsh footballers
Association football defenders
Chester City F.C. players
Bangor City F.C. players